The 2009 BWF World Junior Championship is the eleventh edition of the BWF World Junior Championships, a junior badminton world championship which was held in Alor Setar, Malaysia, from October 23 to November 1, 2009. Six competitions were played during the event with singles in both the boys and girls. Also doubles were played in both sexes as well as the mixed doubles which was played. The final competition was a team event which saw 21 teams compete for the team's title.

Medalists

Team competition
A total of 21 countries competed at the team competition in 2009 BWF World Junior Championships.

Final positions

 China
 Malaysia
 Thailand
 Chinese Taipei
 Indonesia
 Japan
 India
 Hong Kong
 Denmark
 Philippines
 Russia
 Singapore
 Vietnam
 England
 France
 New Zealand
 Germany
 Canada
 Macau
 Sri Lanka
 Australia

Final Round

Individual competitions

Boys Singles

Girls Singles

Boys Doubles

Girls Doubles

Mixed doubles

Seeded

  Lu Kai / Bao Yixin (semi-final)
  Liu Peixuan / Xia Huan (semi-final)
  Maneepong Jongjit / Rodjana Chuthabunditkul (champion)
  Jacco Arends / Selena Piek (fourth round)
  Ng Ka Long / Tse Ying Suet (third round)
  Niclas Nohr / Lena Grebak (second round)
  Kevin Alexander / Suci Rizki Andini (fourth round)
  Pranav Chopra / Prajakta Sawant (fourth round)
  Mark Middleton / Alyssa Lim (second round)
  Akira Kobayashi / Naoko Fukuman (fourth round)
  Ow Yao Han / Lai Pei Jing (quarter-final)
  Tan Wee Tat / Lai Shevon Jemie (third round)
  Nipitphon Puangpuapech / Artima Serithammarak (quarter-final)
  Clinton Liu / May-Lee Lindeman (second round)
  Andreas Heinz / Fabienne Deprez (second round)
  Max Schwenger / Isabel Herttrich (third round)

Finals

Top half

Section 1

Section 2

Section 3

Section 4

Bottom half

Section 5

Section 6

Section 7

Section 8

Medal table

References

External links
World Juniors Team Championships 2009 at Tournamentsoftware.com
World Junior Championships 2009 at Tournamentsoftware.com

 
BWF World Junior Championships
World Junior Championships
Bwf World Junior Championships
Bwf World Junior Championships
Alor Setar
2009 in Malaysian sport
2009 in youth sport